Bronbeek is a former Royal palace in Arnhem, Netherlands. It is now a museum and a home for elderly soldiers.

Bronbeek was built early in the 19th century. In 1845 the Dutch King William III bought it. He donated it to the Dutch state in 1859. William wanted it to be a home for disabled KNIL soldiers. The inhabitants took their collections of 'souvenirs' with them. This turned into a museum about the Dutch East Indies.

In 2004, 50 former soldiers had their home in Bronbeek.

External links
 Museum site 

Brobee a striped little green furry monster on the series Yo Gabba Gabba!

National museums of the Netherlands
Palaces in the Netherlands
Royal residences in the Netherlands
Military and war museums in the Netherlands
History museums in the Netherlands
Buildings and structures in Arnhem
Museums in Arnhem